Allan Ernest Garcia (11 March 1887 – 4 September 1938) was an American actor and casting director, best known for his long association with Charlie Chaplin.

Life and career
Al Ernest Garcia appeared in over 120 films between 1911 and 1938, mostly in supporting roles. He frequently played in silent film westerns with stars including Leo Carrillo and Warner Baxter. Garcia also directed a short film named The Purple Scar in 1917, but it stayed his only work as a director. Born in California to Mexican parents, Garcia played in some Mexican films and also portrayed Mexicans in American films. With the advent of sound film, his roles were somewhat smaller, but he worked as an actor until his death.

Garcia is best remembered for his work with Charlie Chaplin. He acted with Chaplin in six films between 1921 and 1936. Chaplin cast him mostly in clinical or villainous supporting roles. Garcia portrayed the brutal circus director in The Circus (1928), the snobbish butler of the millionaire in City Lights (1931), and the factory owner in Modern Times (1936). He was also a casting director for Chaplin on The Circus, City Lights, and Modern Times. He worked for better pay and improved working conditions for supporting actors and bit players in films, and was co-founder of the Motion Picture Extras and Supporting Players Association, founded in 1933.

On 4 September 1938, Garcia died of a heart attack, in Santa Monica, California, aged 51.

Filmography

1910s

 The Code of Honor (1911, Short)
 The Still Alarm (1911, Short) .... William Manley (as Frank Garcia)
 The Herders (1911, Short) .... Pedro
 Told in the Sierras (1911, Short) .... John Strong - the Prospector (as Albert Garcia)
 Slick's Romance (1911, Short) .... Yuba Frank (as Al E. Garcia)
 Their Only Son (1911, Short) .... Guy Medford (as Albert Garcia)
 The Regeneration of Apache Kid (1911, Short) .... The Apache Kid (as Albert Garcia)
 How Algy Captured a Wild Man (1911, Short) .... Teddy Windleigh (as Albert Garcia)
 Shipwrecked (1911, Short) .... Pierre Binbeau (as Albert E. Garcia)
 Old Billy (1911, Short) .... Fire Commissioner Hewitt
 An Evil Power (1911, Short) .... Antonio Giuseppe (as Al E. Garcia)
 The Cowboy's Adopted Child (1912, Short) .... Dan Mason (as Al E. Garcia)
 The Secret Wedding (1912, Short) .... Leon Braun (as Al E. Garcia)
 Merely a Millionaire (1912, Short) .... Harry Nichols
 The Bandit's Mask (1912, Short) .... Pedro Ramirez (as Al E. Garcia)
 The Test (1912, Short) .... Dalton (as Al E. Garcia)
 Disillusioned  (1912, Short) .... Henry George (as Al E. Garcia)
 The Danites  (1912,  Short) .... Carter - a Danite (as Al E. Garcia)
 Bounder (1912, Short) .... Pete Lopez (as Al E. Garcia)
 The 'Epidemic' in Paradise Gulch (1912, Short) .... Jack Knight
 The Ones Who Suffer (1912, Short) .... The Prison Warden (as Al E. Garcia)
 The End of the Romance (1912, Short) .... Jack Lee
 The Hand of Fate (1912, Short) ... Fritz (as Al E. Garcia)
 A Humble Hero (1912, Short) .... 2nd Claim Jumper (as Al E. Garcia)
 The Lost Hat (1912, Short) .... The Hotel Clerk (as Al E. Garcia)
 A Reconstructed Rebel (1912, Short) .... Dick Winston
 The Vow of Ysobel (1912, Short) .... Jose
 A Messenger to Kearney (1912, Short) .... Palo Vasquez (as A.E. Garcia)
 The Little Indian Martyr (1912, Short) .... Chiquito's Father
 The Indelible Stain (1912, Short) .... Juan (as Al E. Garcia)
 The Substitute Model (1912) .... (as Al E. Garcia)
 The Pirate's Daughter  (1912, Short) .... Vargas - the First Mate
 The Great Drought (1912, Short) .... Dominguez
 An Assisted Elopement (1912, Short) .... Brown - Tom's Chum (as Al E. Garcia)
 Monte Cristo  (1912, Short) .... Fernand (as Al E. Garcia)
 Her Educator (1912, Short) .... Jim O'Keefe (as Al E. Garcia)
 Saved by Fire (1912, Short) .... J. Harden Stone
 The Girl of the Mountains (1912, Short) .... Jim - a Mountain Man (as Al E. Garcia)
 Our Lady of the Pearls (1912, Short) .... Vincente (as Al E. Garcia) 
 A Black Hand Elopement (1913, Short)
 The Artist and the Brute (1913, Short) .... Hortez - the Animal Trainer (as Al E. Garcia)
 Yankee Doodle Dixie (1913, Short) .... Parson Sneed (as Al E. Garcia)
 The Spanish Parrot Girl (1913) .... Jose Raneros
 Margarita and the Mission Funds (1913, Short) .... Ramon, an Outlaw
 With Love's Eyes (1913, Short) .... Dunwood, An Artist
 The Tie of the Blood  (1913, Short) .... Mathews, A Half-Breed
 The Burglar Who Robbed Death (1913, Short) .... Mr. Harrison
 Lieutenant Jones (1913, Short) .... Capt. Stanleigh
 The Stolen Melody (1913, Short) .... Richard Davidge (as A.E. Garcia)
 Woman: Past and Present (1913, Short) .... Father Time
 The Fighting Lieutenant (1913, Short) .... Don Arguello
 A Western Romance (1913, Short) .... Victor Kellogg
 The Reformation of Dad (1913, Short) .... Al B. Stone - the Circus Manager (as Al E. Garcia)
 The Mansion of Misery (1913, Short) .... Prince Lorenzo
 In the Midst of the Jungle (1913, Short) .... (as Al E. Garcia)
 An Actor's Romance (1913, Short) .... Rant - the Hungry Actor
 The Big Horn Massacre (1913, Short) .... Lt. Blake Stevens (as Ernest Garcia)
 The Valley of the Moon (1914) .... Bart (as Ernest Garcia)
 Kate Waters of the Secret Service (1914, Short) .... Bronson (as Al E. Garcia)
 Rose of the Rancho (1914) .... Henchman (uncredited)
 Young Romance (1915) .... Spagnoli (as Al Garcia)
 After Five (1915) .... (as Ernest Garcia) 
 The Country Boy (1915) .... Jimmy Michaelson
 The Unafraid (1915, Short) .... Joseph
 Under Two Flags (1915, Short) .... Rockingham (as Al E. Garcia)
 Gangsters of the Hills (1915, Short) .... Deering - of the Secret Service (as Al E. Garcia)
 Her Atonement (1915) .... John De Forrest
 The Law at Silver Camp (1915, Short) .... Paul Long - a Railway Surveyor
 Clouds in Sunshine Valley (1916, Short) .... Jim Carr (as Al E. Garcia)
 The Greater Power (1916, Short) .... Al Gordon (as Al E. Garcia)
 The Single Code (1917) .... Rodman Wray (as Ernesto Garcia)
 The Purple Scar (1917, Short) .... (as Al E. Garcia)
 Sunlight's Last Raid (1917) .... Pedro (as A. Garcia)
 Restitution (1918) .... Lucifer and Satan (as Alfred Garcia)
 Baree, Son of Kazan (1918) .... 'Bush' McTaggart (as Al Garcia)
 A Gentleman's Agreement (1918) .... Manager of Mine (as Al Garcia)
 The Lamb and the Lion (1919) .... Red Baxter (as Al Garcia)
 Six Feet Four (1919) .... Ben Broderick
 The Trail of the Octopus (1919) .... Wang (as Earnest Garcia)
 The Counterfeit Trail (1919, Short) .... Two Spot Joe (as Al E. Garcia)

1920s

 The Golden Trail (1920) .... Jean the Half-Breed (as Al Garcia)
 Skyfire (1920) .... Pierre Piquet (as Al Garcia)
 Reputation (1921) .... Leading man (stage sequence)
 The Idle Class (1921, Short) .... Cop in Park / Guest (uncredited)
 Pay Day (1922, Short) .... Drinking Companion and Policeman
 The Three Buckaroos (1922) .... 'Card' Ritchie
 The Power God (1925) .... Weston Dore (as Allan Garcia)
 The Gold Rush (1925) .... Prospector (uncredited)
 The Circus (1928) .... The Circus Proprietor and Ring Master (as Allan Garcia)
 Morgan's Last Raid (1929) .... Morgan

1930s

 City Lights (1931) .... James, The Eccentric Millionaire's Butler
 Gran jornada, La (1931) .... Flack
 The Cisco Kid (1931) .... Orderly (uncredited)
 The Deceiver (1931) .... Payne
 Models and Wives (1931, Short)
 South of Santa Fe (1932) .... Captain Felipe Mendezez Gonzales Rodrigues (as Captain Garcia)
 The Gay Desperado (1932) .... Bandit (as Allan Garcia)
 Marido y mujer (1932) .... Dr. Burgess
 One Way Passage (1932) .... Honolulu Cigar Store Proprietor (uncredited)
 The California Trail (1933) .... Sergeant Florez (as Allan Garcia)
 Under the Tonto Rim (1933) .... Mexican Police Chief (as Allan Garcia) 
 Modern Times (1936) .... President of the Electro Steel Corp. (as Allan Garcia)
 The Gay Desperado (1936) .... Police Captain
 The Last Train from Madrid (1937) .... Third Hotel Clerk (uncredited)
 I'll Take Romance (1937) .... Allan Garcia (uncredited)
 Blossoms on Broadway (1937) .... Opera Patron (as Allan Garcia) (uncredited)
 Blockade (1938) .... Minor Role (uncredited)
 In Old Mexico (1938) .... Don Carlos Gonzales (as Al Garcia) (final film role)

References

External links

1887 births
1938 deaths
20th-century American male actors
American male film actors
American male silent film actors
Male actors from California
Male actors from San Francisco
American male actors of Mexican descent